Carrie Louise Hamilton (December 5, 1963 – January 20, 2002) was an American actress, playwright and singer. Hamilton was a daughter of comedian Carol Burnett and producer Joe Hamilton. She was also the older sister of Jody Hamilton, an actress and producer, and singer Erin Hamilton.

Biography
Hamilton worked in a number of productions for film, stage, television and video. She took the role of Reggie Higgins in the TV version of the musical Fame for the fifth and sixth seasons (1985–1987), and portrayed the role of Maureen Johnson in the first national tour of the stage musical Rent to considerable acclaim. She also studied music and acting at Pepperdine University in Malibu, California.

One of her films was Tokyo Pop (1988), in which she played an American singer who journeys to Japan. There, she found a relationship with both a singer (played by Diamond Yukai also known as Yutaka Tadokoro) and a band who made it into the Tokyo pop charts Top Ten. She performed several songs in the film.

In 1992, Hamilton took a minor role in the live-action movie Cool World, which starred Gabriel Byrne, Kim Basinger, and Brad Pitt.

Hamilton married musician  Mark Templin in 1994 on the same soundstage where The Carol Burnett Show was filmed. The couple divorced in 1998.

Hamilton occasionally appeared on television with her mother. In 1987, Burnett guest-starred in an episode of Fame entitled "Reggie and Rose". The pair co-starred in a 1988 TV movie titled Hostage. They appeared on five episodes of Family Feud in 1995, competing with Hamilton's husband Mark Templin and mother-in-law Dalia Ward against a team led by Betty White. in 1997, they starred on an episode of Touched by an Angel entitled "The Comeback". Hamilton played an aspiring Broadway star whose mother (Burnett) had also made a run for Broadway fame, but failed (due to a dirty trick on the part of her conniving best friend, played by Rita Moreno).

In 1999, Hamilton starred in a popular sixth-season episode of The X-Files, entitled "Monday". She played the role of Pam, the girlfriend of a would-be bank robber, who is forced to relive the same day over and over.

Hamilton was the inspiration for the 1983 hit single "Carrie's Gone" (number 79, Billboard), written by former boyfriend Fergie Frederiksen and recorded by his band, Le Roux, after they broke up. The 12-year age difference (Carrie was 19 and Fergie was 31 at the time) was cited as the main reason for the break-up.

Hamilton worked with her mother to adapt Burnett's memoir, One More Time, for the stage play Hollywood Arms, but she did not live long enough to see it produced.

To honour her daughter, Carol Burnett published a book called Carrie and Me: A Mother-Daughter Love Story. This was released on April 8, 2014, and became a New York Times bestselling memoir. People Magazine described it as a “loving, poignant” tribute book to Burnett’s eldest daughter.

Death
Hamilton died from pneumonia as a complication of lung cancer that spread to her brain in Los Angeles, California, on January 20, 2002, at age 38, and is interred in the Westwood Village Memorial Park Cemetery. She started smoking cigarettes in her early teens, and also had a three-year period of heavy drug and alcohol abuse that she successfully overcame by the time she was 15. Except for a brief relapse at 17, she remained drug- and alcohol-free for the remainder of her life.

Theatre
In July 2006, the former Balcony Theatre of the Pasadena Playhouse was rededicated as the Carrie Hamilton Theatre in Hamilton's memory (Burnett is a board member). It hosts a series of readings called "Hothouse at the Playhouse", as well as the Directors Lab West and the Furious Theatre Company. On February 19, 2007, architect Frank Gehry was selected to redesign the Carrie Hamilton Theatre.

Anaheim University Carrie Hamilton Entertainment Institute
On March 23, 2010, Carol Burnett participated in establishing the Anaheim University Carrie Hamilton Entertainment Institute with Anaheim University Vice President for Academic Affairs Dr. David Nunan, reading this quote from Hamilton:

ABOUT ART...The legacy is really the lives we touch, the inspiration we give, altering someone's plan – if even for a moment, and getting them to think, rage, cry, laugh, argue...walk around the block, dazed...(I do that a lot after seeing powerful theater!) More than anything, we are remembered for our smiles; the ones we share with our closest and dearest, and the ones we bestow on a total stranger, who needed it then, and God put you there to deliver.

Filmography
 Love Lives On (1985, as Kathy)
 Fame (as Reggie Higgins, 1986–1987 TV series, 29 episodes)
 Hostage (1988, as Bonnie Lee Hopkin, with Carol Burnett)
 Tokyo Pop (1988, as Wendy Reed)
 Knightwatch (unknown character, 1988 TV series, one episode)
 Shag (1989, as Nadine)
 Single Women, Married Men (1989, as April Clay)
 Checkered Flag (1990, as Alex Cross)
 Murder, She Wrote (as Geraldine Stone, 1990 TV series, one episode)
 Equal Justice (as Jillian Weeks, 1991 TV series, one episode)
 Beverly Hills, 90210 (as Sky, 1991 TV series, one episode)
 Thirtysomething (as Callie Huffs, 1991 TV series, one episode)
 A Mother's Justice (1991, as Debbie)
 Cool World (1992, as comic-book store cashier)
 Walker, Texas Ranger (as Mary Beth McCall, 1995 TV series, two episodes)
 Touched by an Angel (as Allison Bennett, 1997 TV series, one episode, with Carol Burnett)
 Brooklyn South (as Gerrie Fallon-Scranton, 1998 TV series, one episode)
 The X-Files (as Pam 1999 TV series, one episode - "Monday")

 The Pretender (as Jill Arnold, 2000 TV series, one episode)

Soundtracks
 "Where Does the Night Begin?" (on Fame)
 "Always You" (on Fame)
 "Who Put the Bomp" (on Fame)
 "The Shoop Shoop Song" (on Fame)
 "Some Day, Some Way" (on Fame)
 "We Are the Ones" (on Fame)
 "Catch Me I'm Falling Fast" (on Fame)
 "Look and Learn" (on Fame)
 "It's Love I'm After, After All" (on Fame)
 "East of Eden" (on Fame)
 "Only Love Will Hold Fast" (on Fame)
 "We Have The Right" (on Fame)
 "Think" (on Fame)
 "See Your Face Again" (on Fame)
 "He Looks Like Romeo" (on Fame)
 "A Couple of Swells" (on Fame)
 "(You Make Me Feel Like a) Natural Woman" (on Tokyo Pop)
 "Do You Believe in Magic?" (on Tokyo Pop)
 "Never Forget" (on Tokyo Pop)
 "Home on the Range" (on Tokyo Pop)
 "Diff'rent God" (music video)
 "I Am a Boy" (music video)

References

External links

 
 Carrie Hamilton Unofficial Page
 
 Anaheim University Carrie Hamilton Entertainment Institute
 The Carrie Hamilton Theatre
 Carrie Hamilton Theatre info on Pasadena Playhouse homepage

1963 births
2002 deaths
20th-century American actresses
20th-century American dramatists and playwrights
20th-century American singers
20th-century American women singers
American film actresses
American stage actresses
American television actresses
Burials at Westwood Village Memorial Park Cemetery
Crossroads School alumni
Deaths from pneumonia in California
Deaths from lung cancer in California